Robert John Gaudio (born November 17, 1942) is an American singer, songwriter, musician, and record producer, and the keyboardist and backing vocalist of the pop/rock band the Four Seasons. Gaudio wrote or co-wrote and produced the vast majority of the band's music, including hits like "Sherry" and "December, 1963 (Oh, What a Night)". Though he no longer performs with the group, Gaudio and lead singer Frankie Valli remain co-owners of the Four Seasons brand.

Biography

Early career
Born in  the Bronx, New York, Gaudio was raised in Bergenfield, New Jersey, where he attended Bergenfield High School. His mother worked for the publishing house Prentice Hall and his father in a paper factory. He showed an interest in music and studied piano with Sal Mosca.

He grew up in more comfortable middle-class surroundings than the other members of the Four Seasons, which caused some tension and differences early on. He was a cerebral person, interested in reading and learning. He stayed out of trouble and had a mild manner, which proved useful during negotiations throughout his career.

He rose to musical fame at the age of 15 as a member of The Royal Teens, for whom he co-wrote the hit "Short Shorts". In 1958, while he and the group were promoting the single, they met Frankie Valli and his group the Four Lovers as they prepared to perform on a local television program. Wearying of touring, Gaudio left the Royal Teens soon afterward, and the group subsequently dissolved.

One year after he ceased touring, Gaudio joined the Four Lovers. While commercial success was elusive, the group was kept busy with session work (with Bob Crewe as the producer), and a string of performances at night clubs and lounges.

The Four Seasons

In 1960, after a failed audition at a bowling establishment in Union Township, called the "4 Seasons", songwriter/pianist Gaudio shook hands with lead singer Valli and formed the Four Seasons Partnership, and Gaudio, Valli, Tommy DeVito, and Nick Massi became The Four Seasons.

Gaudio wrote the Seasons' first No. 1 hit, "Sherry", 15 minutes before a group rehearsal in 1962. With producer Bob Crewe often assisting with lyrics, Gaudio wrote a string of subsequent hits for the Seasons, including "Big Girls Don't Cry", "Walk Like a Man", "Dawn (Go Away)", "Ronnie", "Rag Doll", "Save It for Me", "Big Man in Town", "Bye Bye Baby", "Girl Come Running", "Beggin'", and "Can't Take My Eyes Off You" (the first big success under Valli's name as a solo performer). Crewe/Gaudio compositions also became major hits for other artists, including the Tremeloes ("Silence Is Golden", originally the B-side of the Four Seasons' "Rag Doll"), The Osmonds ("The Proud One", originally recorded as a Valli solo single) and the Walker Brothers ("The Sun Ain't Gonna Shine Anymore", another Valli single).

After the Beatles' Sgt. Pepper's Lonely Hearts Club Band album was released in June 1967, Gaudio saw the pop music market changing, and sought to position the Four Seasons into the trend of socially conscious music. One evening he went to the Bitter End in Greenwich Village and saw Jake Holmes performing. Gaudio was taken with Holmes' song, "Genuine Imitation Life", and decided to base a Four Seasons album upon it. With Holmes as his new lyricist, The Genuine Imitation Life Gazette album was released in January 1969. The album was a commercial failure and symbolized the end of the Four Seasons' first period of success. The appreciation of The Genuine Imitation Life Gazette has grown over the years, and it was re-released on CD (minus the newspaper cover) in the 1990s by Rhino in the U.S. and Ace in the UK. Gaudio and Holmes also wrote and produced Frank Sinatra's 1969 album Watertown.

In 1975 Gaudio wrote "Who Loves You" and "December 1963 (Oh, What a Night)" with his future wife Judy Parker. The songs became big hits for a reconstituted Four Seasons group (only Valli was left of the original lineup; Gaudio stopped touring with them in 1971 to concentrate on writing and producing).

Gaudio, Tommy DeVito, Frankie Valli and Nick Massi the original members of The Four Seasons were inducted into the Rock and Roll Hall of Fame in 1990 and the Vocal Group Hall of Fame in 1999.

Other activity
In addition to his work for the Seasons and Sinatra, he wrote and/or produced for Michael Jackson, Barry Manilow, Diana Ross, Eric Carmen, Nancy Sinatra, Peabo Bryson, and Roberta Flack. In particular, he produced six complete albums for Neil Diamond, and the movie soundtrack albums for Diamond's The Jazz Singer and Little Shop of Horrors. Gaudio also produced the hit "You Don't Bring Me Flowers" for Barbra Streisand and Neil Diamond, a duet that reached the top of Billboard charts in 1978, for which he received a Grammy Award nomination.

In the 1990s Gaudio moved to Nashville and produced recordings for Canadian country artist George Fox, among others. He lured Neil Diamond to Nashville to record the album Tennessee Moon. In recent years Gaudio has focused on musical theater, writing the music for the 2001 London West End production of Peggy Sue Got Married.

Gaudio was instrumental in mounting Jersey Boys, a musical play based on the lives of the Four Seasons, which ran at the La Jolla Playhouse through January 2, 2005, and then opened on Broadway on November 6, 2005, to mostly positive reviews. In 2006, the play won four Tony Awards, including Best Musical. In 2007, it won a Grammy in the Best Musical Show Album category.

Gaudio was inducted into the Songwriters Hall of Fame in 1995.

On February 3, 2009, Gaudio received his high school diploma, 50 years after dropping out of Bergenfield High School.

On May 12, 2012, Gaudio received the Ellis Island Medal of Honor for his commitment to many humanitarian causes.

On June 20, 2014, Warner Bros. released the film version of Jersey Boys, directed by Clint Eastwood in which Gaudio was portrayed by Erich Bergen. In Jersey Boys, credit is given to a then-teenaged Joe Pesci for introducing Gaudio to Tommy DeVito.

On July 1, 2014, Rhino Entertainment released Audio with a G, the first compilation of the music composed by Bob Gaudio as performed by the Four Seasons, Frank Sinatra, Diana Ross, The Temptations, Cher, Roberta Flack, Nina Simone, Jerry Butler, Chuck Jackson and others.

References

External links

 
 
  Bob Gaudio at the Songwriters' Hall of Fame
 Watertownology -- a site to study the Watertown album

1942 births
Living people
American male singers
American rock pianists
American male pianists
Record producers from New York (state)
Record producers from New Jersey
Songwriters from New York (state)
Songwriters from New Jersey
American people of Italian descent
Singers from New Jersey
Jersey Shore musicians
The Four Seasons (band) members
Grammy Award winners
People from Bergenfield, New Jersey
20th-century American keyboardists
Bergenfield High School alumni
20th-century American pianists
21st-century American pianists
20th-century American male musicians
21st-century American male musicians
American male songwriters